Puerto Rico Highway 116 (PR-116) is a main highway in the southwest part of Puerto Rico, beginning in Guánica, Puerto Rico at Puerto Rico Highway 2 to Lajas, Puerto Rico at Puerto Rico Highway 101.

Route description
It is the main route to Guánica and Lajas, and grants access to places such as the Dry Forest of Puerto Rico (Bosque Seco), common for its cacti and dry, desert-like climate, and also to beaches like Parguera in Lajas and Playa Santa in Guánica. It is divided, two lane-per-direction in the first 4 kilometers before turning one lane-per direction in the rest of its length. The width of its lanes allows for speed limits above the normal rural roads.

Major intersections

Related routes
Currently, PR-116 has three branches in its old segments in Guánica and Yauco. Originally they were identified as PR-116R.

Puerto Rico Highway 1116

Puerto Rico Highway 1116 (PR-1116) was the old section of PR-116 between Guánica and Yauco. It extended from PR-116 between Caño and Carenero barrios to PR-121 in Susúa Baja. In 2015, this highway was designated as Avenida Agustín "Quino" López Oliveras and renumbered to PR-326.

Puerto Rico Highway 3116

Puerto Rico Highway 3116 (PR-3116) is an old segment of PR-116 that provides access to Ensenada.

Puerto Rico Highway 4116

Puerto Rico Highway 4116 (PR-4116) is the original route of PR-116 through downtown Guánica. This road can be seen as Puerto Rico 116 Business.

See also

 List of highways numbered 116

References

External links

 Inspeccionan puente de la carretera PR-116 

116